= Cârciumaru =

Cârciumaru is a Romanian occupational surname literally meaning "innkeeper" (borrowed from the Slavic term корчма (korchma) for inn, tavern). Notable people with the surname include:

- Ion Cârciumaru (born 1931), Romanian politician, several times member of the Senate of Romania
- Florin Cârciumaru (born 1956 died 4 October 2025), Romanian politician, former member of the Senate of Romania (2016–2020)
